Betula globispica, is a species of birch native to Japan, where it grows naturally in the mountains of central Japan. Though rare in nature, saplings were planted at the Royal Botanic Gardens, Kew in  1957.

References

Flora of Japan
globispica